La Sorcière is a 1956 fantasy romance drama film directed by André Michel based on a screenplay by Paul Andréota and Jacques Companéez. Adapted from the 1898 Alexander Kuprin novel Olesya.

Plot summary 
A French civil engineer (Maurice Ronet) is working in Sweden where he meets a local girl named Ina.

Cast 
 Marina Vlady as Ina
 Nicole Courcel as Kristina Lundgren
 Maurice Ronet as Laurent Brulard
 Michel Etcheverry as Camoin
 Rune Lindström as Reverend Hermansson
 Erik Hell as Pullinen
 Eric Hellström as Erik Lundgren
 Ulla Lagnell as Mrs. Hermansson
 Naima Wifstrand as Maila
 Ulf Palme as Matti

Awards
At the 6th Berlin International Film Festival it won the Silver Bear award for Outstanding Artistic Contribution.

See also
 Olesya (1971 film)

References

External links
 

1956 films
1956 drama films
Films directed by André Michel
Films set in Sweden
1950s French-language films
French vigilante films
Adaptations of works by Aleksandr Kuprin
Silver Bear for outstanding artistic contribution
Films scored by Norbert Glanzberg
1950s French films
French drama films
French black-and-white films